Choi Hung Estate Catholic Secondary School is a boy's secondary school situated in Choi Hung Estate, Wong Tai Sin, Hong Kong. Established on 28 February 1965 by Roman Catholic Diocese of Hong Kong.

Mission

History

1960s 
School enrolled new students at Pui Shing Catholic Secondary School from March to August, and received them fees at Wong Tai Sin Catholic Primary School. In the early year, there were only 440 boys in 11 classes from form 1 to form 3, and 14 teachers. In first academic year, school shared its school building with Sanpokong Catholic Secondary School. On 28 February 1965, school was opened and inaugurated by Bishop Bianchi. 1967, there were already 847 boys in 22 classes from form 1 to form 5.

Facilities

Motto

Alumni 
Lok Ying kwan, actor.
Tsang Kin Fong, footballer.
Anskar Leung Yu Hung, Clinical Professor, Li Ka Shing Faculty of Medicine, University of Hong Kong.

References 
 

Secondary schools in Hong Kong
Catholic secondary schools in Hong Kong
Educational institutions established in 1965
Boys' schools in Hong Kong
Wong Tai Sin
Ngau Chi Wan
1965 establishments in Hong Kong